Eyn-e Hammad (also Romanized as ‘Eyn-e Ḩammād, ‘Eyn-e Hamād, and ‘Eyn Ḩamād) is a village in Howmeh-ye Gharbi Rural District, in the Central District of Ramhormoz County, Khuzestan Province, Iran. At the 2006 census, its population was 163, in 28 families.

References 

Populated places in Ramhormoz County